Patrick Trahan (born November 7, 1986) is a former American football linebacker.  He was signed by the Tennessee Titans as an undrafted free agent in 2010. He played college football at Auburn and Northwest Mississippi Community College for two years (one at Auburn, one at Northwest), and two at Ole Miss, where he recorded 98 tackles, 7 sacks, 16.5 tackles for loss, one quarterback pressure, two interceptions, three forced fumbles and one fumble recovery. In January 2011, Trahan was signed to the Chicago Bears practice squad after the termination of Rashaun Greer's contract. In November 2011, Trahan was promoted to the active roster after waiving Brian Iwuh.

Trahan was released by the Bears on September 8, 2012. He was once again waived by the Bears on December 4. Trahan was brought back on January 8, 2013, and was again released on August 25.

References

External links
 Tennessee Titans bio
 Auburn Tigers bio
 Ole Miss Rebels bio
 Chicago Bears bio

1986 births
Living people
St. Augustine High School (New Orleans) alumni
American football linebackers
Chicago Bears players
Edmonton Elks players
Northwest Mississippi Rangers football players
Ole Miss Rebels football players
Players of American football from Baton Rouge, Louisiana
Tennessee Titans players